Susan K. Stone (b. Aug. 29, 1960) is a former Canadian athlete who competed in middle and long distance races. She became the Canadian National Champion in the 10K in 1988 after only beginning to run in 1983.

Stone became a prominent runner along with international competitors Zhong Huandi, Marguerite Buist, Ellen Rochefort, Sissel Grottenberg, and Odette Lapierre. She was ninth at the 1988 Boston Marathon, 7th at the 1986 Osaka Women's Marathon (in Japan), 13th at the 1987 London Marathon, 13th at the 1986 New York City Marathon and 13th at the 1985 Chicago Marathon. Stone was selected for the Canadian team at the 1987 World Championship Marathon and the 1989 World Cross Country Championships.

She is the winner of the 1985 and 1987 Around the Bay Road Race, the 1986 and 1988 Subaru 4-Mile Chase (in Buffalo, New York), the 1985 Grandma's Marathon, the 1988 Toronto Marathon, the 1984 Avon Women's NYC Half Marathon, and was second at the 1984 Marine Corps Marathon. She continued to run and compete in age categories (masters) after taking time off to further her teaching career and to raise a family.

Achievements

See also
 Canadian records in track and field

References

1960 births
Living people
Canadian female long-distance runners
Sportspeople from Toronto
Canadian Track and Field Championships winners